Thomas Joseph Kersey (August 1846 – April 16, 1888) was a United States Navy sailor and a recipient of the United States military's highest decoration, the Medal of Honor.

Military service
Born in 1846 in St. John's, Newfoundland, Kersey immigrated to the United States and was living in Everett, Massachusetts, when he joined the Navy on October 19, 1870, for a 3-year enlistment.

By July 26, 1876, he was serving as an ordinary seaman on the 14-gun screw sloop . On that day, he rescued a crewmate from drowning at the Brooklyn Navy Yard. For this action, he was awarded the Medal of Honor two weeks later, on August 9. Two other Plymouth sailors, Landsman William Corey and Seaman Charles Gidding, attempted to rescue a shipmate from drowning on the same day and also received the medal.

He later served on the USS Wabash and the USS New Hampshire.  He was married to Mary C. Egan.

Medal of Honor citation
Rank and organization: Ordinary Seaman, U.S. Navy. Born: 1847, St. Johns, Newfoundland. Accredited to: Massachusetts. G.O. No.: 215, 9 August 1876.

Kersey's official Medal of Honor citation reads:
Serving on board the U.S.S. Plymouth at the Navy Yard, New York, 26 July 1876, Kersey displayed bravery and presence of mind in rescuing from drowning one of the crew of that vessel.

Death and burial
Kersey was admitted to the Chelsea Naval Hospital on April 2, 1888, and died there of nephritis (kidney inflammation) on April 16, 1888, at age 41 years and 8 months.   He was buried in St. Mary's Cemetery in Newport, Rhode Island.

See also

List of Medal of Honor recipients during peacetime

References

1847 births
1888 deaths
People from St. John's, Newfoundland and Labrador
Canadian emigrants to the United States
People from Everett, Massachusetts
United States Navy sailors
United States Navy Medal of Honor recipients
Canadian-born Medal of Honor recipients
Non-combat recipients of the Medal of Honor